The Beshtak Palace or Qasr Bashtak ("Palace of Bashtak") is a historic palace and museum in Cairo, Egypt, built by the Mamluk amir Sayf al-Din Bashtak al-Nasiri in the 14th century. It is located on Shari'a al-Mu'izz (al-Mu'izz street), in the area known as Bayn al-Qasrayn ("between the two palaces", in reference to the great Fatimid palaces that formerly stood here).

History 

In 1262, Sultan al-Zahir Baybars transferred parts of the Fatimid palaces of Cairo to the property of the state treasury, allowing thenceforth for the sale and redevelopment of property in this central area of the city. In 1334-1339, Bashtak, a powerful amir (i.e. an officer or lord in the Mamluk hierarchy) who was married to a daughter of Sultan al-Nasir Muhammad and held the prestigious court position of the Sultan's Master of the Robes, built a residence and stables over part of the Eastern Palace adjacent to the main street.

The remains of the palace were restored in 1983 by the German Archaeological Institute and constitute a rare surviving example of 14th century domestic architecture in Cairo.

Description 

Only part of the palace remains today. However, the edifice was originally five stories tall, and featured running water on all floors. Outside, at street level, the building had openings for shops whose revenues would have contributed to the amir's income, possibly following a model from Roman times. The most impressive surviving part of the palace is the large qa'a or reception hall. The hall features a coffered wooden ceiling, stucco windows of coloured glass, and a fountain of inlaid marble in the centre, which were decorative elements typical of the time and found in other buildings from the same era, like the nearby Mausoleum of Sultan Qalawun. The north and south sides of the hall also feature mashrabiyya (i.e. latticed wood screen) windows on the upper floors, allowing for women or other members of the household to privately watch events or festivities happening in the hall below.

See also 
 List of Historic Monuments in Cairo

References

External links 

Bishtak Palace

Museums in Cairo
Palaces in Cairo
History museums in Egypt
Historic house museums in Egypt
Mamluk architecture in Egypt
Muizz Street